Eischen's Bar is a bar and restaurant in Okarche in Okarche, Oklahoma. It is the oldest bar in the state.

History
Eischen Bar was built by Peter Eischen as a watering hole in Oklahoma City in 1896. It closed during the Prohibition and reopened in the 1930s under the management of Peter’s son, Nick. 

Nick went on a hunting trip in the 1940s and won an 1800s spanish handmade backbar that was added to the watering hole. A fire struck the bar in 1993 which destroyed its memorabilia that lined the walls. Nick's grandsons, Ed Eischen, and Paul, opened the bar in less than a year.

References

Restaurants in Oklahoma
1896 establishments in Oklahoma Territory
Oklahoma Historical Society